Daniel Thomas Hylton (born 25 February 1989) is an English professional footballer who plays as a striker for  club Northampton Town.

Career

Aldershot Town
Born in Camden, Greater London, Hylton joined Aldershot Town aged 16 in 2005, when he was signed by Terry Brown. During the 2007–08 season, Hylton was part of the team which won the Conference Premier title and the Conference League Cup. Among his appearances, Hylton played in their first League Cup match, when he came on as a 69th-minute substitute for Marvin Morgan in a 3–1 defeat to Coventry City on 13 August 2008.

In March 2007, Hylton joined Harlow Town on loan before he sustained an injury on his debut, making one appearance as a result.

On 6 January 2011, it was reported Hylton had agreed to sign for AFC Wimbledon. However, he later signed a one-year contract extension to remain with Aldershot under new manager Dean Holdsworth.

Rotherham United
On 18 June 2013, Hylton signed a two-year contract with newly promoted League One club Rotherham United, with the option of a third year. He made his Rotherham debut in a 1–0 win away to Brentford on 5 October. Ten days later, Hylton was loaned out to League Two club Bury until 23 November.

On 27 January 2014, Hylton joined AFC Wimbledon on loan for the remainder of the 2013–14 season. Rotherham were promoted to the Championship at the end of the season, and Hylton was transfer-listed.

Oxford United
Hylton joined League Two club Oxford United on a two-year contract on 6 June 2014. He ended the 2014–15 season as Oxford's top goalscorer with 16 goals in all competitions, 14 of which came in the league. On 3 April 2016, he scored Oxford's second goal in the 2016 Football League Trophy Final at Wembley Stadium, which Oxford lost 3–2 to Barnsley.

Luton Town
Hylton turned down a new contract with Oxford to sign for League Two club Luton Town on a two-year contract on 31 May 2016. He scored the opening goal on his debut in Luton's 3–0 win away to Plymouth Argyle on the opening day of 2016–17. Hylton scored a hat-trick for Luton in a 4–1 win at home to Wycombe Wanderers on 3 September, which saw him earn a place in the English Football League Team of the Week. He scored twice from the penalty spot for Luton in a 3–1 victory away to Exeter City in the FA Cup first round, ensuring their progression to the second round. Hylton signed a contract extension with Luton on 12 January 2017 until June 2019, with the prospect of a further extension until 2020, having scored 14 goals from 26 appearances up to that point in 2016–17. He scored twice during a home match against Crawley Town on 11 February, the first coming in the 70th minute and the second coming in the 76th minute, which made the score 2–1 to Luton, and was once again named in the English Football League Team of the Week. Hylton was named the PFA Fans' League Two Player of the Month for February 2017, during which he scored four goals in five league appearances. His performances for Luton saw him named in the PFA League Two Team of the Year, as well as being named Luton Town Player of the Season, voted for by the club's supporters. Hylton played in both legs of Luton's play-off semi-final defeat to Blackpool, which finished 6–5 on aggregate, and scored a penalty in the 3–3 home draw in the second leg. He finished the season with 47 appearances and 27 goals.

Ahead of 2017–18, Hylton had an operation on his lower leg which saw him miss the start of the season. His first appearance of the season came against Tottenham Hotspur U21 in an EFL Trophy group stage match on 15 August 2017, in which he was substituted at half-time. Hylton scored his first goal of 2017–18 in his 50th appearance for Luton with the equaliser away to Mansfield Town 11 days later, which finished a 2–2 draw. He was named the PFA Fans' League Two Player of the Month for October 2017, having scored four goals from five league appearances.

His contract was extended by a further year at the end of the 2017–18 season after a promotion clause was triggered as a result of Luton's promotion to League One.

Northampton Town
Hylton signed a two-year contract with League Two club Northampton Town on 21 June 2022 effective from 1 July when his Luton contract expired.

Career statistics

Honours
Aldershot Town
Conference League Cup: 2007–08
Conference Premier: 2007–08

Oxford United
Football League Trophy runner-up: 2015–16
Football League Two runner-up: 2015–16

Luton Town
EFL League Two runner-up: 2017–18
EFL League One: 2018–19

Individual
PFA Fans' League Two Player of the Month: February 2017, October 2017
PFA Team of the Year: 2016–17 League Two, 2017–18 League Two
Luton Town Player of the Season: 2016–17

References

1983 births
Living people
Footballers from Camden Town
English footballers
Association football forwards
Aldershot Town F.C. players
Harlow Town F.C. players
Rotherham United F.C. players
Bury F.C. players
AFC Wimbledon players
Oxford United F.C. players
Luton Town F.C. players
National League (English football) players
Isthmian League players
English Football League players